Leonard Warner "Feets" Barnum (September 18, 1912 – November 24, 1998) was an American football quarterback who played professionally in the National Football League (NFL) for the New York Giants and the Philadelphia Eagles. He was the first and only quarterback selected in the inaugural NFL Draft in 1936.

Early life and education
Barnum attended West Virginia Wesleyan College. He served in the United States Navy during the World War II era.

References

External links
 

1912 births
1998 deaths
American football punters
American football quarterbacks
Marietta Pioneers football coaches
New York Giants players
Philadelphia Eagles players
West Virginia Wesleyan Bobcats football players
United States Navy personnel of World War II
United States Navy sailors
People from Columbia City, Indiana
Sportspeople from Parkersburg, West Virginia
Coaches of American football from West Virginia
Players of American football from West Virginia